Malingee is a nocturnal malignant Australian Aboriginal spirit.  In Aboriginal mythology, they prefer to avoid humans, but when provoked, they will slay mercilessly with a stone knife.  Malingees have knees of stone that knock together, making a scraping sound, and have eyes that smolder like the coals of a cold fire.  These features were supposed to make it possible for humans to detect and avoid nearby Malingees.

See also
 List of Australian Aboriginal deities

References 
7 Aboriginal Creatures

Australian Aboriginal legendary creatures